The South African Police Silver Cross for Gallantry was a decoration that existed between 1985 and 1989.

History
Instituted on 29 January 1985, the SCG was awarded to all ranks of the South African Police for conspicuous and exceptional gallantry while fighting terrorism.

The SCG is a silver cross pattee, displaying a gold SAP badge enclosed in a laurel wreath.  The reverse depicts the SAP Memorial at Berg-en-Dal.  The ribbon is blue, with white-red-white edges.

The SCG was discontinued when the SA Police Cross for Bravery was expanded to three classes on 17 May 1989.

See also

 South African civil honours
 South African police decorations

Notes

References

External links
 South African Medals Website

Law enforcement in South Africa
Police decorations and medals of South Africa
Courage awards
1985 establishments in South Africa
Awards established in 1985
Awards disestablished in 1989
1989 disestablishments in South Africa